Nuvuktiqpaaraaluk (Inuktitut syllabics: ᓄᕗᒃᑎᖅᐹᕌᓗᒃ) formerly Nuvursirpaaraaluk Island is an uninhabited island located in the Qikiqtaaluk Region, Nunavut, Canada. It is a Baffin Island offshore island in Hudson Strait.

Other islands in the immediate vicinity include: Lavoie Island, Wishart Island, Black Bluff Island, Kaavvijjuaq, Qaqqannalik, Poodlatee Island, Anguttuaq, Aulatsiviit, Ijjuriktuq, Ivvitsa, Takijualuk, Kinngarjuaq, and Uugalautiit Island.

References

Islands of Baffin Island
Islands of Hudson Strait
Uninhabited islands of Qikiqtaaluk Region